Thubten Gyatso (born Adrian Feldmann) is an Australian monk and was ordained by Lama Thubten Yeshe in the 1970s and was one of the first Westerners to become a monk in the Gelug school of Tibetan Buddhism.  He is a Foundation for the Preservation of the Mahayana Tradition veteran who has been instrumental in establishing a number of Dharma centres in France, Taiwan, Australia, and Mongolia.

Born in Melbourne in 1943, Adrian Feldmann graduated from the University of Melbourne with a degree in medicine. After practising medicine in Australia and overseas, he travelled for several years through Iraq, Afghanistan and Pakistan, eventually finding his way to a Tibetan monastery in Nepal. After much study and soul-searching, he became ordained as the Buddhist monk, Venerable Thubten Gyatso. Since then he has run a free medical practice in Nepal, taught Buddhism and meditation in Nepal and in France, establishing monasteries in France and in Bendigo, Victoria, Australia.

In the late nineties, Gyatso lectured extensively in the USA. He then spent some years in Mongolia, where he was well regarded, and his teachings were presented on radio and television and published in the local newspapers.

Books

Gyatso's most recent book, A Leaf in the Wind, is a personal account of one man's search for happiness which is often humorous and sometimes shocking. Venerable Gyatso doesn't shirk revealing the mistakes and failings which help to highlight his personal message of hope. He wants us to know that the ego undermines our happiness and fortifies our habitual destructive emotions. His spiritual path is a quest to slay the ego and his life story is a parable for modern times.

The Perfect Mirror: Reflections on Truth and Illusion  explains the principal teachings of the Buddha and reflects on the search for a truthful way of life, the pursuit of happiness, birth, death, love, friendship, sex, marriage and raising children. Peppered throughout are entertaining and astounding true stories from his life: stories of ghosts in the Nepalese mountains, the mysterious appearance of Western-style breakfasts in a remote monastery in the Himalayas and how his first parachute jump was an excellent preparation for realizing the sky-like nature of the emptiness of all things.

See also

FPMT
Gelug
Lama Yeshe
Lama Zopa
Nick Ribush
Thubten Shedrup Ling

References

External links
A Leaf in the Wind: A Life's Journey (2005), Lothian Books.
Thubten Shedrup Ling Monastery

Year of birth missing (living people)
Living people
Australian scholars of Buddhism
Tibetan Buddhism writers
Tibetan Buddhist spiritual teachers
Tibetan Buddhists from Australia
Medical doctors from Melbourne
Australian Buddhist monks